Jan de Man Lapidoth (June 16, 1915 – June 11, 1989) was a Swedish bobsledder who competed in the 1950s. He won a bronze medal in the four-man event (tied with West Germany) at the 1953 FIBT World Championships in Garmisch-Partenkirchen.

At the 1952 Winter Olympics in Oslo, Lapidoth finished sixth in the four-man event and eighth in the two-man event.

Four years later he finished 13th in the four-man event at the 1956 Winter Olympics.

References
Bobsleigh four-man world championship medalists since 1930
Wallenchinsky, David. (1984). "Bobsled". In The Complete Book of the Olympics: 1896-1980. New York: Penguin Books. pp. 558, 561.

1915 births
1989 deaths
Swedish male bobsledders
Olympic bobsledders of Sweden
Bobsledders at the 1952 Winter Olympics
Bobsledders at the 1956 Winter Olympics
20th-century Swedish people